Haji Yusifli Mosque ( sometimes also transliterated as Hajy Yusifli Mosque) was an Azerbaijani mosque located in Shusha, Karabakh region of Azerbaijan about 350 km southwest from capital Baku.

Overview
The mosque is located on intersection of G. Zakir and G.Ismayilov streets of Haji Yusifli neighborhood of Shusha. Haji Yusifli neighbourhood is one of 9 lower and earlier neighbourhoods of Shusha in the northern part of the city. In total, there are 17 main neighbourhoods. Julfalar Mosque was one of the 17th mosques functioning in Shusha by the end of the 19th century. There were no minarets and exterior design of Julfalar Mosque followed a rectangular plan neighborhood mosque building like Chukhur Mahalla and Julfalar mosques but the interior completely complied with Islamic religious architecture. There was a Haji Yusifli spring by the mosque supplying the famous mineral water of Shusha for public use. The Haji Yusifli mosque went through a complete renovation along with Yukhari Govhar Agha, Ashaghi Govhar Agha, Taza Mahalla, Mamayi, Saatli, Kocharli mosques, Caravanserai of Agha Gahraman Mirsiyab, residences of Mehmandarovs, Zohrabbayovs, Khurshidbanu Natavan and the “Shirin su” bath house before occupation. The mosque was among the most valuable monuments of the Shusha State Historical and Architectural Reserve.

See also
Yukhari Govhar Agha Mosque
Ashaghi Govhar Agha Mosque
Saatli Mosque
Seyidli Mosque
Khoja Marjanli Mosque
Guyulug Mosque
Taza Mahalla Mosque

References

External links

View of the Haji Yusifli neighbourhood mosque of XVIII before Armenian occupation of Shusha 
Karabakh Monuments

Mosques in Shusha
18th-century mosques